Yugoslavia was present at the Eurovision Song Contest 1963, held in London, United Kingdom.

Before Eurovision

Jugovizija 1963 
The Yugoslav national final, to select their entry, was held on 1 February in Belgrade. There were 8 songs in the final, one from each of the six republics and the two autonomous provinces submitted through their respective subnational public broadcasters. Four subnational broadcasters made their debut; Radio Skopje, Radio Titograd, Radio Prishtina, and Radio Novi Sad. The winner was chosen by the votes of an eight-member jury of experts, one juror for each of the six republics and the two autonomous provinces. The winning entry was "Brodovi", performed by Croatian singer Vice Vukov, composed and written by Mario Nardelli. He previously came 6th in the 1962 Yugoslav Final.

At Eurovision
Vice Vukov performed 9th on the night of the Contest following Denmark and preceding Switzerland. At the close of the voting the song had received 3 points, placing 11th in a field of 16 competing countries.

Voting

Notes

References

External links
Eurodalmatia official ESC club
ECSSerbia.com

1963
Countries in the Eurovision Song Contest 1963
Eurovision